The  or Kokkiken (国基研) is a public and foreign policy think tank in Tokyo, Japan, privately funded and founded in December 2007 by Yoshiko Sakurai.

Overview 
On its English website about JINF: "We take great pride in our time-honored Japanese civilization and intend to reconsider Japan as it should be, in a wide and global perspective. At the same time, in order to cope with the sea change that is taking place internationally, we urgently hope to reconstruct Japan, which is now malfunctioning in many sectors of our society. Consequently, with a view to re-addressing fundamental issues that Japan faces, we have established the Japan Institute for National Fundamentals (JINF)."

At a press conference, Yoshiko Sakurai stated the purpose of establishing the organization: "This has been my dream for a long time. How can we rebuild post-war Japan, a nation that can hardly be called a nation, and what should the Japanese people do to achieve this? A series of questions have been running through my mind and heart throughout my life. Each time, I wrote articles and continued to appeal. The National Institute for National Fundamentals, which I just established, is an extension of this process".

It regularly gives policy proposals to the Japanese government and holds monthly "study" meetings and international symposiums.

Membership 
JINF has close ties to the ultranationalist organization Nippon Kaigi and many of its members also come from various ultranationalist textbook reform organizations/movements like Japanese Society for History Textbook Reform, Japan Education Rebirth Institute (Kyoiku Saisei), and Society to Improve Textbooks.

From Nippon Kaigi, some prominent members include chairman Tadae Takubo, secretary general Yuzo Kabashima, former Tokyo governor Shintaro Ishihara, and policy committee member Akira Momochi.

Organization 
References.

President 
 Yoshiko Sakurai (Journalist)

Vice presidents 
 Tadao TAKUBO (Professor Emeritus, Kyorin University, chair of Nippon Kaigi)
 Katsuhiko TAKAIKE (Lawyer)
 Yoshito OGURA (President of NIPPON ARCOIRIS)

Directors 
 Hironobu ISHIKAWA (Journalist)
 Takashi ITO (Professor Emeritus, University of Tokyo)
 Yasuo OHARA (Professor Emeritus, Kokugakuin University)
 Minoru KITAMURA (Professor Emeritus, Ritsumeikan University)
 Tadashi SAITO (Former Director, Bungei Shunju Ltd.)
 Shiro TAKAHASHI (Professor, Meisei University)
 Ryutaro TSUCHIDA (Professor Emeritus, University of Tokyo)
 Taikin TEI (Chung Daekyun, 鄭大均, 정대균) (Professor Emeritus, Tokyo Metropolitan University)
 Tadashi NARABAYASHI (Professor Emeritus, Hokkaido University)
 Osamu NISHI (Professor Emeritus, Komazawa University)
 Koichiro BANSHO (Lieutenant General (Re+))
 Yoshifumi HIBAKO (Former Chief of Staff, JGSDF)
 Sukehiro HIRAKAWA (Professor Emeritus, University of Tokyo)
 Koichi FURUSHO (Former Chief of Staff, JMSDF)
 Hiroshi FURUTA (Professor, College of Social Sciences, University of Tsukuba)
 Tamao HOSOKAWA (Journalist)
 Akira MOMOCHI (Professor Emeritus, Nihon University)
 Yoshihiko YAMADA (Professor, Tokai University)
 Taro YAYAMA (Political Analyst)
 Hiroshi YUASA (Sankei Shimbun special press)
 Toshio WATANABE (Executive advisor for academic affairs, Takushoku University)

Auditor 
 Yukio GOTO (Lawyer,  Former Prosecutor at Kyoto Public Prosecutors Office)

Publication 
JINF publishes weekly short commentaries written by various professionals on current issues. The institute also publishes a newsletter reporting activities every other month for its members.

Awards
Since 2014, the JINF has administered two annual prizes, a Kokkiken Japan Study Award and Japan Study Encouragement Award. Through these awards, the Foundation "encourages and honors outstanding works in the field of Japanese studies at home and abroad that contribute to the furthering of understanding of Japan in the areas of politics, national security, diplomacy, history, education and culture, among others."

Funding
The Japan Institute for National Fundamentals is a fully private-funded think tank. There are three types of membership of the institute, Individual, Supporter and Corporate membership, all of which are completely open.

Suspicion 
Yoshiko Sakurai, serving as the President, and Tadae Takubo (Professor Emeritus of Kyorin University and the chairman of Nippon Kaigi), serving as the VP, are considered by some left-wing pundits to be revisionists of history.

References

External links
Japan Institute for National Fundamentals

2007 establishments in Japan
Anti-communist organizations in Japan
Security studies
Think tanks established in 2007
Think tanks based in Japan
Nippon Kaigi